Ginger Obinna Onwusibe is a Nigerian politician, who will serve as member of the House of Representatives representing Isiala Ngwa South/Isiala Ngwa North federal constituency. Onwusibe was elected in the 2023 Nigerian House of Representatives elections in Abia State.

References 

21st-century Nigerian politicians
Year of birth missing (living people)
Living people